{{DISPLAYTITLE:C13H19NO}}
The molecular formula C13H19NO (molar mass: 205.30 g/mol) may refer to:

 Amfepramone
 Dimethylaminopivalophenone
 N-Ethylpentedrone
 4-Methylpentedrone

Molecular formulas